Fitzinger's algyroides (Algyroides fitzingeri), also called the pygmy algyroides or the pygmy keeled lizard, is a species of lizard in the family Lacertidae.

Etymology
The specific name, fitzingeri, is in honor of Austrian herpetologist Leopold Fitzinger.

Geographic range
A. fitzingeri is found only in Corsica and Sardinia.

Habitat
The natural habitats of A. fitzingeri are temperate forests, temperate shrubland, Mediterranean-type shrubby vegetation, temperate grassland, rocky areas, arable land, pastureland, and rural gardens.

See also
List of reptiles of Italy

References

Further reading
Arnold EN, Burton JA (1978). A Field Guide to the Reptiles and Amphibians of Britain and Europe. London: Collins. 272 pp. + Plates 1-40. . (Algyroides fitzingeri, p. 118 + Plate 18, figure 4 + Map 58).
Duméril AMC, Bibron G (1839). Erpétologie générale ou Histoire naturelle complète des Reptiles. Tome cinquième [Volume 5]. Paris: Roret. viii + 854 pp. (Lacerta fitzingeri, p. 194). (in French).
Engelman W-E, Fitzsche J, Günther R, Obst FJ (1993). Lurche und Kriechtiere Europas: Beobachten und bestimmen. Radebeul, Germany: Neumann Verlag. 440 pp. (including 324 color plates, 186 figures, 205 maps). (in German).
Wiegmann AFA (1834). Herpetologia Mexicana, seu descriptio amphibiorum Novae Hispaniae, quae itineribus comitis Sack, Ferdinandi Deppe et Chr. Guil. Schiede in Museum Zoologicum Berolinense pervenerunt. Pars prima, saurorum species amplectens. Adiecto systematis saurorum prodromo, additisque multis in hunc amphibiorum ordinem observationibus. Berlin: C.G. Lüderitz. vi + 54 pp. + Plates I-X. (Notopholis fitzingeri, new species, p. 10). (in Latin).

External links

Algyroides
Fauna of Corsica
Fauna of Sardinia
Lizards of Europe
Reptiles described in 1834
Taxa named by Arend Friedrich August Wiegmann
Taxonomy articles created by Polbot